The Spin Crowd is an American reality television series on E! that debuted August 22, 2010. The series chronicles the lives of six employees who all work for a Hollywood public relations firm. The show did not return for a second season.

Episodes

References

External links
 

2010s American reality television series
2010 American television series debuts
2010 American television series endings
American television spin-offs
English-language television shows
E! original programming
Reality television spin-offs
Television series by Bunim/Murray Productions